Malayotyphlops luzonensis, also known as the Luzon blind snake or Luzon worm snake, is a species of snakes in the Typhlopidae family.

References

luzonensis
Reptiles described in 1919